The 2002–03 season is River Plate's 73nd season in the Argentine Primera División. 
The season was split into two tournaments (format adopted since 1990–91 season) Apertura (Opening) 2002 (from August to December 2002), and Clausura (Closing) 2003 (from February to June 2003).

The club's kit was provided by Adidas, and the sponsor was Budweiser beer.

Season events
On May 23, 2002, Manuel Pellegrini was presented as new manager of River Plate.

On July 22, midfielder Lucho González moved from Huracán to River Plate. The transfer was made for US$700,000.

On June 15, 2003 during Round 16 of Torneo Clausura 2003, River Plate defeated Lanús and because Velez and Boca tied games, finished the match day as sole leaders.

On June 29, during Round 18, River defeated Olimpo in Bahía Blanca and won the championship, by getting a difference of 4 points to rivals Boca Juniors, with only 1 round to go.

Apertura Squad

Clausura Squad

Transfers

In

Out

Competitions

Pre-season and friendlies

Apertura 2002

League table

Results by matchday

Fixtures and results

Clausura 2003

League table

Results by matchday

Fixtures and results

Evolution of the league table
River Plate, Boca Juniors and Velez Sarsfield were the teams who kept the championship lead for most of the tournament.

2002 Copa Sudamericana

2003 Copa Libertadores

Group stage

Knockout phase

Round of 16

Quarter-finals

Squad statistics

Appearances and goals

Source: www.footballdatabase.eu – www.livefutbol.com

References

Sources
Estévez, Diego Ariel; Ciento cinco: historia de un siglo rojo y blanco; 2006 

Club Atlético River Plate seasons
2002–03 in Argentine football
River Plate